Krnov (or Krnów) is a town in Bruntál District in the Moravian-Silesian Region of the Czech Republic. It has about 23,000 inhabitants.

Administrative parts
The town is made up of town parts of Pod Bezručovým vrchem and Pod Cvilínem, and of village of Krásné Loučky.

Geography
Krnov lies in the historical region of Upper Silesia on the border with Poland. The town is located at the confluence of the rivers Opava and Opavice.

The northern part of the territory with the town proper is situated in the Zlatohorská Highlands, the western and the southern part are situated in the Nízký Jeseník mountain range. A small part on the southeast extends into the Opava Hilly Land within the Silesian Lowlands.

History

The first written mention of Krnov is from 1240. At the latest in 1269 and probably already in 1253, Krnov was a town. In the second half of the 13th century, town fortifications were built. In 1273, the Minorites came into the town and established a monastery.

Krnov was a part of Duchy of Troppau until 1377, when the Duchy of Krnov separated and the town became its capital. Krnov prospered, guilds were established and textile crafts developed. In 1523, the Duchy of Krnov was acquired by the Hohenzollern family. They had built a castle here and during their rule, the town achieved its greatest prosperity and population growth.

The prosperity ended with the Thirty Years' War. The battles caused the town to decline and subsequently stagnate. After the war, the duchy was acquired by the House of Liechtenstein who began the re-Catholicization of the entire duchy. In the 17th and 18th centuries, the town stagnated economically, but several Baroque monuments were created here. After the War of the Austrian Succession, Krnov became a border town. In 1779, a large fire destroyed almost the entire town.

The development of the town was restored by the industrial revolution in the 19th century. Textile factories began to be established, and within a few decades Krnov more than doubled its population. The railway, which was opened in 1872, also helped the development.

According to the Austrian census of 1910, the town had 16,681 inhabitants. The census had asked people for their native language; 15,390 (98.4%) were German-speaking and 247 (1.5%) were Czech-speaking. Jews were not allowed to declare Yiddish, thus most of them declared German as their native language. The most populous religious groups were Roman Catholics with 15,290 (91.7%), followed by Protestants with 885 (5.3%) and the Jews with 459 (2.8%).

From 1938 to 1945 it was occupied by Germany as a part of the Reichsgau Sudetenland. During World War II, the Germans operated a Gestapo prison and four forced labour subcamps of the Stalag VIII-B/344 prisoner-of-war camp in the town. After the war, the German population was expelled, in accordance to the Potsdam Agreement.

In 1948, refugees from Greece fleeing as a result of the Greek Civil War came into Czechoslovakia, and in Krnov and its surroundings they formed a significant community. They successfully assimilated, and although most of them returned to their homeland after 1975, several hundred of them still remain.

Demographics

Economy
Krnov is known for the production of cola-based drink Kofola by the eponymous company, which is the largest industrial employer based in the town.

One of the largest local companies was Rieger–Kloss which manufactured pipe organs. It was founded in 1873 and production has continued to the present, but after financial problems, it went into insolvency in 2018 and production was stopped.

Transport

Krnov is located on the Ostrava–Olomouc and Krnov–Głuchołazy railway lines. The town is served by has railway stations, Krnov and Cvilín.

The road border crossings Krnov-Horní Předměstí / Ciermięcice, Krnov / Pietrowice, and Chomýž / Chomiąża are located in the municipal territory.

Sights

The landmark of the town square is the Neorenaissance town hall. It was built in 1901–1903 on the site of an old town hall from the 16th century. The town hall was designed by Leopold Bauer, native of Krnov. The second urban landmark is the town savings bank, connected with the town hall. The Art Nouveau-Baroque building with a richly structured façade was built in 1906–1907.

The Krnov Synagogue is the only synagogue in the region which survived to this day in its original form. The interior is the Moorish Revival style. Today it serves as an exhibition and concert hall.

The Church of Saint Martin in the historic centre was first documented in 1281. The wooden church was replaced by the current stone one at the turn of the 14th and 15th centuries. The second tower was added in the 16th century. One of the towers is open to the public as a lookout tower.

The Church of Saint Benedict consists of a rotunda from the 13th century and a church without a tower. The interior is decorated with valuable frescoes from the period between the 13th and 15th centuries.

The Baroque complex of the Minorite monastery with the Church of the Nativity of the Virgin Mary was built after 1779, when the original Gothic buildings were destroyed by a fire. The monastery was abolished in 1950 and restored in 1989.

Krnov Castle was built in 1531–1535. Today it serves commercial purposes and as an administrative seat, only the courtyard is freely accessible.

Cvilín is hill known as a pilgrimage site with the Church of Our Lady of the Seven Sorrows and Stations of the Cross. The church was built in 1722–1727 and replaced the wooden chapel, which did not have enough capacity for the number of believers participating in the pilgrimage. It is one of the most important Baroque monuments in the region. It is a stone romantic building topped by a lookout with a battlement. In the second part of the Cvilín hill is the ruin of the Cvilín Castle. It was built before 1253 and destroyed during the Thirty Years' War.

Notable people

Carol Benesch (1822–1896), architect
Charles Louis Fleischmann (1835–1897), Austrian inventor and distiller
Leopold Bauer (1872–1938), Austrian architect
Grete Berger (1883–1944), Austrian-German actress
Robert Hohlbaum (1886–1955), Austrian-German writer and playwright
Liesl Herbst (1903–1990), Austrian tennis player
Norbert Riedel (1912–1963), Austrian engineer and entrepreneur
Hanns Cibulka (1920–2004), German poet
Edith Ballantyne (born 1922), Canadian activist
Jiří Georg Dokoupil (born 1954), Czech-German painter and graphic artist
Zdeňka Šilhavá (born 1954), discus thrower
Leon Koudelak (born 1961), classical guitarist
Jaroslav Sakala (born 1969), ski jumper
Radek Bonk (born 1976), ice hockey player

Twin towns – sister cities

Krnov is twinned with:

 Głubczyce, Poland
 Karben, Germany
 Lykovrysi-Pefki, Greece
 Mińsk Mazowiecki, Poland
 Nadvirna, Ukraine
 Prudnik, Poland
 Rajec, Slovakia
 Saint-Égrève, France
 Telšiai, Lithuania

Gallery

References

External links

 
Tourist information centre
Sudeten German homeland district of Jägerndorf 
Krnov Friends' Club 

 
Cities in Silesia
Populated places in Bruntál District
Cities and towns in the Czech Republic
Czech Republic–Poland border crossings